Al-Thakera Publishing House is an Iraqi publishing house established in 2001. The house has published many literary publications, books and Arabic novels, and has participated in many local and international book fairs.

History
Al-Thakera Publishing House was founded in Baghdad by Dr. Issam Al-Kawaz in 2001. Before that, it was a library before it was transformed in the same year into an official Iraqi publishing house serving literary and political issues, biographies, memoirs, history books, philosophy, social sciences, religion, national thought, art illustrated books and children's books. It has a wide distribution network and agents in most parts of the world, and several offices in Baghdad, Amman, Cairo and Beirut. It also has a lot of training programs and cultural workshops in cooperation with Kasha Company and Academia Library Development Company in Jordan and the Library Association in Lebanon.
 

The house has published many literary publications, books and Arabic novels, and has also participated in many local and international book fairs. The publications of the house vary and cover different topics, on top of which is history. The house has published various works in different fields, including: Critical studies, Religious books, Poetry, trips ethics, Anecdotal collections, Novels (historical - social - detective - philosophical - psychological horror), Children's books, Articles and Thoughts and Marketing.

In 2018, Al-Thakera Publishing House was longlisted for International Prize for Arabic Fiction, through the novel "Mohammed's Brothers" by Maysalun Hadi.

Cultural activities 
Al-Thakera Publishing House was participated in many book fairs like: Cairo International Book Fair, Baghdad Book Fair, Riyadh International Book Fair and Sharjah International Book Fair.

Authors
Al-Thakera Publishing House has published the works of many well-known contemporary authors:
Maysalun Hadi
Hadia Hussein
Munqith Dagher
Safwa Fahim
Emad Abboud Abbas

References

External links
Al-Thakera Publishing House Official Website

Publishing companies established in 2001
Publishing companies of Iraq
2001 establishments in Iraq